The Bolnisi inscriptions are the Old Georgian inscriptions written in the Georgian Asomtavruli script on the Bolnisi Sioni Cathedral, a basilica located in Bolnisi, Bolnisi Municipality, Georgia. The inscriptions are dated AD 493/494. The construction of the basilica commenced in AD 478/479. Bolnisi inscription yields the most explicit reference to Peroz I, the Shahanshah ("King of Kings") of the Sasanian Empire. Construction of the basilica might have been connected to the accession of Peroz; their builders being encouraged in their efforts by the imperial construction projects.

Inscriptions

Inscription 1
ႵႤႣႧႤႮႨႱႩႭႮႭႱႨႩႰႤႡႭ
ჃႪႨႧႭჃႰႧႣႠႠႫႠႱႤႩ
ႪႤႱႨႠႱႠ bolnisi cross ႸႨႬႠႸႤႬႣ
ႠႫႨႫႠ bolnisi cross ႰႧႧႠჃ
ႷႠႬႨႱႫ bolnisi cross ႺႤႫႤႪ
ႬႨႸႤႨႼႷ bolnisi cross ႠႪႤႬႣႠ
ႫႸႰႭႫႤႪႧႠႠႫႠႱႤႩႪႤ
ႱႨႠႱႠႸႨႬႠႸႤႾႤႼႨႤႨႨ
Translation: Jesus Christ, have mercy on David the Bishop and those who built this church for your worship.

Inscription 2

ႨႱႠႱႠႫႤႡႨႱႠჂႧႠႭႺႼႪႨႱႠႮႤႰႭႦႫႤႴ
ႠႫႨႱႤႩႪႤႱႨႠჂႱႠჂႣႠႠႧႾႭჃႧႫႤႲႼႪႨႱ
ႬႠႵႠႸႨႬႠႧႠჃႷႠႬႨႱႾႺႤႱႶႬႸႤႨႼႷႠႪႤႬႣႠႥႨႬႠ
ႮႨႱႩႭႮႭႱႱႠႾႭჃႪႭႺႭႱႨႢႨႺႠႶႬႸႤႨႼႷႠႪႤ
Translation: With the mercy of Trinity, 20 years of reigning King Peroz when founded this church and 15 years thereafter it was completed. God have mercy who show reverence herein, and the builder of this church David the Bishop, and who pray for you, o God have mercy, Amen.

See also
Bir el Qutt inscriptions
Georgian graffiti of Nazareth and Sinai
Umm Leisun inscription

References

Bibliography
Rapp, Stephen H. Jr. (2014) The Sasanian World through Georgian Eyes: Caucasia and the Iranian Commonwealth in Late Antique Georgian Literature, Ashgate Publishing, 

Georgian inscriptions
Archaeological artifacts
5th-century inscriptions
490s
Kvemo Kartli
Bolnisi
Peroz I